Tilak Pariyar is a Nepalese politician currently serving as the Governor of Karnali Province. He was appointed Governor, as per the Article 163 (2) of the Constitution of Nepal by the President Bidya Devi Bhandari on the recommendation of the Council of Ministers of the Government of Nepal on 9 November 2021. He previously served as the 2nd Governor of Province No. 2 of Nepal. He is former member of the 1st Nepalese Constituent Assembly from Banke-1 constituency.

Personal life
Pariyar was born in Liwang, Rolpa district on 31 October 1943 to Hasta Bahadur Pariyar and Bhakti Devi Pariyar. He did his secondary education and Bachelor degree from India. Pariyar is married to Chandra Pariyar, with whom he has four sons and four daughters.

References

Living people
Communist Party of Nepal (Maoist Centre) politicians
Nepalese atheists
1943 births
Governors of Madhesh Province
Khas people
Members of the 1st Nepalese Constituent Assembly